The 2020 NCAA Division I women's volleyball tournament began on April 14, 2021, and concluded on April 24 at the CHI Health Center Omaha in Omaha, Nebraska. The tournament field was announced on April 4, 2021. Typically held in the fall, this edition of the tournament was held in the spring due to the COVID-19 pandemic.

Kentucky beat Texas in the final to claim the first national volleyball championship not only for Kentucky, but also for its home of the Southeastern Conference.

Tournament schedule and venues 

First round, second round and Regional semifinals (April 14, 15 and 18)
 CHI Health Center Omaha (Convention Center), Omaha, Nebraska (Host: University of Nebraska)

Regional Finals, National semifinals and championship (April 19, 22 and 24)
 CHI Health Center Omaha (Arena), Omaha, Nebraska (Host: University of Nebraska)

All games were played at the CHI Health Center Omaha. Twelve courts were built in the Convention Center portion of the building, 8 for practices and 4 for games. Attendance was limited to 80 people per game for the first and second rounds, mostly consisting of team family members. Additional fans were admitted as teams went home. Games moved from the convention center to the CHI Health Center Omaha arena for the Regional Finals, semifinals, and National Championship.

Qualifying teams

Automatic qualifiers

The following teams automatically qualified for the 2020 NCAA field by virtue of winning their conference's tournament. Only 30 conference champions received automatic qualifiers after the Big West Conference and Ivy League chose not to have a 2020 fall or 2021 spring season. This was the first tournament appearance for North Carolina A&T and Utah Valley.

Tournament seeds

Bracket

Top Left Regional

Schedule

First round

Second round

Regional semifinals
Due to BYU's "No Sunday Play" policy, the BYU regional semifinal was moved to April 17.

Regional final

Bottom Left Regional

Schedule

First round

Second round

Regional semifinals

Regional final

Top Right Regional

Schedule

First round

Second round

Regional semifinals

Regional final

Bottom Right Regional

Schedule

First round

Second round

Regional semifinals

Regional final

Final four

National semifinals

National Championship

Final Four All-Tournament Team

Madison Lilley – Kentucky (Most Outstanding Player)
Alli Stumler – Kentucky
Avery Skinner – Kentucky
Brionne Butler – Texas
Logan Eggleston – Texas
Samantha Drechsel – Washington
Devyn Robinson – Wisconsin

Media coverage
For the first time ever all matches will air on the ESPN Family of networks. Rounds 1 and 2 will stream on ESPN3. Initially ESPN didn't plan to provide commentators for these rounds. After criticism from fans and coaches they changed course and announced they would provide commentary for the first two rounds. The regional semifinals will have select matches on ESPN2 and ESPNU with the remainder on ESPN3. All regional finals will air on ESPN2 or ESPNU, ESPN will carry the semifinals, and ESPN2 will carry the National Championship.

First & Second Rounds
Mike Monaco (Court 1 Afternoon)
Courtney Lyle (Court 1 Evening)
Matt Schick (Court 2 Afternoon)
Sam Gore (Court 2 Evening)
Sam Ravech (Court 3 Wed. Afternoon)
Eric Frede (Court 3 Thurs. Afternoon)
Tyler Denning (Court 3 Evening) 
Alex Perlman (Court 4 Afternoon)
Paul Sunderland (Court 4 Evening)

Regional semifinals & Regional Finals
Eric Frede and Katie George (Court 1 Sun. Afternoon)
Courtney Lyle and Missy Whittemore (Court 3 Sun. Afternoon, Mon. Afternoon)
Paul Sunderland and Salima Rockwell (Court 1 Sun. Evening,  Mon. Evening)
Tyler Denning and Jenny Hazelwood (Sat., Court 3 Sun. Evening)

Semifinals & National Championship
Paul Sunderland, Salima Rockwell, and Holly Rowe

Records by Conference

The R32, S16, E8, F4, CM, and NC columns indicate how many teams from each conference were in the Round of 32 (second round), Round of 16 (third round), quarterfinals (Elite Eight), semi-finals (Final Four), Championship Match, and National Champion, respectively.
The following conferences failed to place a team into the round of 32: America East, Big East, Colonial, MAAC, Missouri Valley, Northeast, Patriot, Southern, Southland, SWAC, Summit, and the WAC. The conference's records have been consolidated in the other row.

Notes

References

2020–21 NCAA Division I women's volleyball season
NCAA
April 2021 sports events in the United States
NCAA Women's Volleyball Championship
Volleyball in Nebraska
Sports competitions in Nebraska